Bertie Hazell, CBE (18 April 1907 – 11 January 2009), also known as Bert Hazell, was a British Labour Party politician and trade union activist.

The son of a Norfolk farm worker, he left school at 14 to work on a farm in Wymondham, where his duties included scaring crows. When agricultural wages slumped after the First World War sparking the Norfolk farm workers' strike in 1923, Hazell became active in the National Union of Agricultural Workers. He worked as a district organiser for the NUAW, 1937–1964.

He unsuccessfully contested the safe Tory parliamentary seat of Barkston Ash in Yorkshire in the 1945 and 1950 elections, before returning to Norfolk to help North Norfolk Labour MP Edwin Gooch. In 1945 he came within 116 votes of victory in Barkston Ash.

He was elected Member of Parliament (MP) for North Norfolk in 1964 by just 53 votes.  The constituency was unusual in being an agricultural seat electing Labour MPs since 1945, owing to a history of organised agricultural trade unionism and a working-class rural Labour vote in Norfolk at the time, very atypical of the rest of the country. He was re-elected in 1966, when his majority was 737 votes. He lost his seat at the 1970 general election to the Conservative Ralph Howell who held the seat for 27 years.  Subsequently, Labour have never regained Norfolk North, and were relegated to third place when the Liberal Democrats gained the seat in 2001.

As president of the NUAW for 10 years until he retired in 1978, Hazell devoted nearly 60 years to the cause of agricultural workers. He had a lengthy career in the health service including as chair of York Health Authority in the 1980s.

Hazell was made an MBE for services to agriculture in 1946 and a CBE for services as chairman of the regional board for industry in 1962.

Hazell, who reached his 100th birthday in April 2007, was the third longest-living MP in British history; only Theodore Cooke Taylor (102) and Ronald Atkins (104) have lived longer. On 6 November 2008 he overtook Lord Shinwell's record as the longest-living former MP of recent times. Upon Hazell's death, James Allason became the oldest living former MP.

He died on 11 January 2009, aged 101. He was three months short of his 102nd birthday.

See also
Records of members of parliament of the United Kingdom

References

External links 
 

1907 births
2009 deaths
English centenarians
Men centenarians
Presidents of the National Union of Agricultural and Allied Workers
Labour Party (UK) MPs for English constituencies
National Union of Agricultural and Allied Workers-sponsored MPs
UK MPs 1964–1966
UK MPs 1966–1970
Commanders of the Order of the British Empire
People from Wymondham
People associated with the University of East Anglia